José Luis Cazares Quiñónez (born 14 May 1991) is an Ecuadorian footballer who plays for Club 9 de Octubre.

Club career
He began his career with Guayaquil City in 2010.

Career statistics

References

1991 births
Living people
Association football midfielders
Ecuadorian footballers
Ecuadorian Serie A players
C.S.D. Macará footballers
Guayaquil City F.C. footballers
L.D.U. Quito footballers
Sportspeople from Guayaquil